Magne Dæhli (born 24 April 1987) is a Norwegian orienteering competitor, ski-orienteer, and cross-country skier. His achievements include five medals in the relay at the World Orienteering Championships, of which three are gold medals. His best individual performances include a silver medal in the long distance from the European Orienteering Championships, and a bronze medal in the middle distance from the 2019 World Orienteering Championships.

Junior career
Dæhli competed at the 2005 Junior World Orienteering Championships in Tenero, where he received a gold medal in the relay event. He won two silver medals in the 2007 junior world championships, in the long distance and in the relay. He competed at the 2005 Junior World Ski Orienteering Championships, where he placed seventh in the sprint, ninth in the middle distance, and fourth in the relay. At the 2006 Junior World Ski Orienteering Championships, he won a bronze medal in the middle distance, a bronze medal in the long distance, placed sixth in the sprint, and won a silver medal in the relay with the Norwegian team.

Senior career
Dæhli competed for Norway at the 2012 World Orienteering Championships. In the middle distance he qualified for the final, where he placed seventh, 1:23 minutes behind winner Edgars Bertuks. He was part of the Norwegian team that placed second in the relay at the 2012 World Championships, along with Carl Waaler Kaas and Olav Lundanes. He placed 20th overall in the Orienteering World Cup in 2012. At the 2013 World Orienteering Championships he placed fifth in the long distance, and sixth in the relay with the Norwegian team. In 2013 he placed 17th overall in the World Cup. He competed in the 2014 World Orienteering Championships in Italy, where he placed 11th in the long course. In 2014 he placed 10th overall in the World Cup. He achieved a silver medal in the relay in the 2015 World Orienteering Championships in Inverness, where he also placed fourth in the middle distance, and 13th in the long distance. In 2015 he placed fifth overall in the World Cup. He was part of the winning team in the relay at the 2016 World Orienteering Championships in Strömstad, where he also placed sixth in the middle and sixth in the long distance. In 2016 he placed seventh overall in the World Cup. At the 2017 World Orienteering Championships in Tartu he won a gold medal in the relay for the second time, and placed fourth in the long and ninth in the middle distance.

In 2018, Dæhli won a gold medal in the relay at the European Orienteering Championships in Switzerland. Dæhli won the overall O-Ringen in Sweden in 2018. He won a gold medal in the relay at the 2018 World Orienteering Championships in Latvia, together with Gaute Hallan Steiwer and Eskil Kinneberg. Dæhli was running the last leg of the world championship relay, winning the race with a few seconds margin ahead of Switzerland and France. This was the third consecutive World Championships gold medal for Dæhlie in the men's relay, being part of the winning Norwegian relay team in 2016, 2017 and 2018. He placed seventh in the long distance at the 2018 World Championships. At the 2019 World Orienteering Championships in Østfold, he won a bronze medal in the middle distance, placed sixth in the long distance, and was running the last leg in the relay, where the Norwegian team placed fifth.

Personal life
Dæhli was born in Løten, and is son of orienteer and ski-orienteer Sigurd Dæhli.

References

External links

1987 births
Living people
Norwegian orienteers
Male orienteers
Foot orienteers
Ski-orienteers
World Orienteering Championships medalists
Norwegian male cross-country skiers
People from Løten
Sportspeople from Innlandet
Junior World Orienteering Championships medalists